Source control may refer to:

 Version control in computing
Source control (respiratory disease), techniques to reduce spread of respiratory diseases such as COVID-19
 A treatment for sepsis involving physical intervention at the source of an infection
 Source control action, a procedure used for Superfund sites